Resttschechei or Rest-Tschechei (German for "remainder of Czechia") was a term used by Nazis to refer to:

Second Czechoslovak Republic, after the loss of the Sudetenland in September 1938
Protectorate of Bohemia and Moravia, after the loss of Slovakia in March 1939